Radhika Menon is an Indian publisher. She is the founder of Tulika books which was started by her publishing business in 1996.

Early days 
She mentioned that as a child she liked reading writers such as Enid Blyton, Charles Hamilton and W.E. Johns.

Career
In 1978, with an interest in children's education, Menon worked at the J. Krishnamurti school. After J Krishnamurthi school in Chennai, she moved to Sardar Patel Vidyalaya in Delhi. 

Menon and her sister in law Indu Chandrasekhar ran a pre-press service called Tulika to "earn enough money" to publish their own books. Subsequently, Chandrasekhar founded Tulika Books in New Delhi in 1995, and Menon founded Tulika Publishers in Chennai.

Tulika Books 
Tulika's books for children pioneered a significant wave in Indian publishing in 1996. They publish children literature in languages such as English, Hindi, Tamil, Malayalam, Kannada, Telugu, Marathi, Gujarati and Bengali.

References

External links
 Official website of Tulika Books
 Publishingnext.in

Living people
Year of birth missing (living people)
Indian publishers (people)
Indian women publishers